= 200LR =

200LR may refer to:

- Boeing 777-200LR, aircraft variant
- Bombardier CRJ-200LR, aircraft variant
